Lieutenant General Prabodh Chandra Bhardwaj, PVSM, AVSM, VrC, SC, VSM is a former General Officer of the Indian Army. He last served as the Vice Chief of Army Staff, having assumed office on 1 October 2009 following the retirement of Lieutenant General Noble Thamburaj. He also served as the General Officer Commanding-in-Chief Northern Command. He is one of the most decorated officers of the Indian Army, with a war-time gallantry award and a peace-time gallantry award to his name.

Career
Lieutenant General PC Bhardwaj was commissioned into 1st battalion, Parachute Regiment on 14 June 1970. He is an alumnus of National Defence Academy, Indian Military Academy, Defence Services Staff College, Wellington and National Defence College.

A specialist in Special Operations, he was the first person from the Indian Army to undergo the rigorous Commando Divers Course at Naval Diving School. He excelled on the course, qualifying as an instructor. He has also attended the Special Forces Officers Course at Fort Bragg in the US and earned an instructor rating.

He commanded his battalion, 1 Para (Commando), in counter-insurgency operations along India's eastern border with China and Myanmar, and later commanded counter-insurgency Force Delta in Doda/Kishtwar. He commanded a mountain brigade in Nagaland and also the elite 50th Parachute Brigade. As a brigadier, he commanded an infantry brigade and was the deputy director general at the Directorate General of Military Operations, Army Headquarters. He was appointed as the Defence Attache at Embassy of India at Yangon in Myanmar from 1994 to 1997. 
As a Major General, he was the General Officer Commanding Delhi Area where he was awarded the Ati Vishisht Seva Medal for distinguished service. Upon promotion to the rank of Lieutenant General, he commanded XIV Corps, responsible for the vast areas of Ladakh and the Siachen Glacier before assuming command of Northern Command on 1 March 2008. Upon being awarded the Param Vishisht Seva Medal on 26 January 2009, he became the most decorated soldier in the Indian Army.

Post Military Career
Lt. Gen Bhardwaj is a board member of the Welham Boys' School and also on the governing council of the Raphael Ryder Cheshire International Centre, both in Dehradun.

Honours and decorations

Vir Chakra Citation
As a Second Lieutenant, Bhardwaj was awarded the Vir Chakra for operations during the Indo-Pakistani War of 1971. His Vir Chakra citation reads as follows.

Shaurya Chakra Citation
As a Colonel, Bhardwaj was also awarded the Shaurya Chakra for a rescue operation where tourists who were stranded in a cable car were rescued in a joint operation conducted by 1 Para (Commando) and the Indian Air Force. His Shaurya Chakra citation reads as follows:

Dates of rank

References 

Vice Chiefs of Army Staff (India)
Indian generals
Recipients of the Param Vishisht Seva Medal
Recipients of the Ati Vishisht Seva Medal
Recipients of the Vir Chakra
Recipients of the Shaurya Chakra
Recipients of the Vishisht Seva Medal
National Defence Academy (India) alumni
Living people
Para Commandos
Year of birth missing (living people)
National Defence College, India alumni
Indian military attachés
Defence Services Staff College alumni